Migrastatin is an organic compound which naturally occurs in the Streptomyces platensis bacteria. Migrastatin and several of its analogues (including Isomigrastatin) have shown to have potential in treating cancer, as it inhibits the metastasis of cancer cells.

References 

Macrolides
Glutarimides
Alcohols
Methoxy compounds
Ketones